Bua is a locality situated in Varberg Municipality, Halland County, Sweden, with 2,123 inhabitants in 2020.

References 

Populated places in Halland County
Populated places in Varberg Municipality